Below the Radio is a mixtape put together by Jason Lytle of American indie rock band Grandaddy, released in 2004 by record label Ultra. The album also included a new Grandaddy track, "Nature Anthem".

Background 

Ultra Records had approached Grandaddy frontman Jason Lytle via his management some time earlier with the idea for him to compile a mixtape, and he decided to include tracks that he considered "sleeper hits", identifying a common theme: "They all seem to have pretty conventional and familiar chord progressions. They all have vivid imagery for me with their words. There also seems to be a bit of sadness, but not necessarily despair."

Reception 

AllMusic's Matt Collar stated the album "plays like a K-Tel commercial for Gen X sad-sackism", calling it "pretty cool". Brian Howe of Pitchfork wrote "for the most part, the songs [Lytle] selected sound quite a bit like his own band. Lush yet sleek and slightly sterile is the dominant style of Below the Radio".

Track listing 

 Beck – "We Live Again"
 Beulah – "Burned by the Sun"
 Earlimart – "Color Bars"
 Snow Patrol – "Run"
 Goldenboy – "Wild Was The Night"
 Giant Sand – "Bottom Line Man"
 Fruit Bats – "The Little Acorn"
 Home – "Comin' Up Empty Again"
 Jackpot – "If We Could Go Backwards"
 The Handsome Family – "I Fell"
 Little Wings – "Sand Canyon"
 Pavement – "Motion Suggests"
 Blonde Redhead – "For the Damaged"
 Virgil Shaw – "Twisted Layer"
 Grandaddy – "Nature Anthem"

References

External links 

 

2004 compilation albums
Grandaddy albums